1950 Albanian Cup was the fourth season of Albania's annual cup competition. It began in spring 1950 with the First Round and ended in May 1950 with the Final match. Partizani were the defending champions, having won their second Albanian Cup last season. The cup was won by Dinamo Tirana.

The rounds were played in a one-legged format. If the number of goals was equal, the match was decided by extra time and a penalty shootout, if necessary.

First round
Games were played in March, 1950*

 Results unknown.

Second round
Games were played in March, 1950.

|}
+ Puna Korçë won by corners.

Quarter-finals
In this round entered the 8 winners from the previous round.

|}

Semi-finals
In this round entered the four winners from the previous round*

|}

 Results unknown. All is known Partizani and Dinamo Tirana qualified.

Final

References

 Calcio Mondiale Web

External links
 Official website 

Cup
1950 domestic association football cups
1950